Naughty but Nice is a 1939 Warner Bros. musical comedy film directed by Ray Enright, starring Dick Powell and Ann Sheridan and featuring Gale Page, Ronald Reagan, and Helen Broderick, with Allen Jenkins, ZaSu Pitts, and Maxie Rosenbloom in supporting roles.  The original story and screenplay were written by Richard Macaulay and Jerry Wald, and the film includes songs with music by Harry Warren and lyrics by Johnny Mercer, as well as music adapted from Bach, Beethoven, Liszt, Mozart, Robert Schumann, and Wagner. Ann Sheridan did her own singing in the film, except for song "In a Moment of Weakness", in which she was dubbed by Vera Van.

Plot
Professor Donald Hardwick (Dick Powell), who lectures his students against swing music and jitterbugging, goes to New York City to get his symphony published, but accidentally writes a hit swing song ("Hooray for Spinach, Hooray for Milk") with the connivance of aspiring lyricist Linda McKay (Gale Page), which brings him into disrepute with the Dean of his college (Halliwell Hobbes). After the teetotaling professor accidentally gets drunk, Hardwick promises to stay in New York City for the summer and write songs with McKay, and they have three more hits.

Unfortunately, singer Zelda Manion (Ann Sheridan) exploits his talents to her own advantage by getting Hardwick drunk again, and tricking him into signing a contract with her publisher. His new lyricist, Joe Dirk (Allen Jenkins), gets Hardwick in trouble by copying a classical piece of music and signing Hardwick's name to it. At Hardwick's trial, his aunts (Helen Broderick, ZaSu Pitts, Vera Lewis and Elizabeth Dunne) convince the judge (Granville Bates), a songwriter himself, that the earlier melody was copied from an even earlier piece now in the public domain, and the judge throws the case out.

Cast

Ann Sheridan as Zelda Manion
Dick Powell as Professor Donald Hardwick
Gale Page as Linda McKay
Helen Broderick as Aunt Martha Hogan
Ronald Reagan as Eddie Clark
Allen Jenkins as Joe Dirk
ZaSu Pitts as Aunt Penelope Hardwick
Maxie Rosenbloom as Killer

Jerry Colonna as Allie Gray
Luis Alberni as Stanislaus Pysinski
Vera Lewis as Aunt Annabella Hardwick
Elizabeth Dunne as Aunt Henrietta Hardwick
William B. Davidson as Samuel "Simsy" Hudson, music publisher
Granville Bates as Judge Kennith B. Walters, Superior Court
Halliwell Hobbes as Dean Burton, Winfield College

Production
Naughty but Nice had the working titles of "Professor Steps Out" and "Always Leave Them Laughing".

After seven years and 37 films, singer Dick Powell was tired of being typecast at Warner Bros., so he refused to resign when his contract was up: Naughty but Nice was his last film for the studio, which responded by not releasing it. A year later they changed their minds when Ann Sheridan started to receive a great deal of publicity, and was labelled "The Ooomph Girl".  To cash in on it, they belatedly released Naughty but Nice, pushing Sheridan's billing over Powell's.

References

External links

1939 films
1939 musical comedy films
American musical comedy films
American satirical films
American black-and-white films
Films about music and musicians
Films directed by Ray Enright
Films set in New York City
Warner Bros. films
1930s English-language films
1930s American films